Rissoina angeli is a species of minute sea snail, a marine gastropod mollusk or micromollusk in the family Rissoinidae.

Description
The height of the shell attains  6.3 mm.

Distribution
This species occurs in the Gulf of Mexico and the Caribbean Sea off Cuba.

Description 
The maximum recorded shell length is 6.3 mm.

Habitat 
Minimum recorded depth is 50 m. Maximum recorded depth is 50 m.

References

 Espinosa J. & Ortea J. (2002) Descripción de cuatro nuevas especies de la familia Rissoinidae (Mollusca: Gastropoda). Avicennia 15: 141-146. page(s): 142
 Rosenberg, G., F. Moretzsohn, and E. F. García. 2009. Gastropoda (Mollusca) of the Gulf of Mexico, Pp. 579–699 in Felder, D.L. and D.K. Camp (eds.), Gulf of Mexico–Origins, Waters, and Biota. Biodiversity. Texas A&M Press, College Station, Texas.

External links
 

Rissoinidae
Gastropods described in 2002